"Young Love" is a song by English/Australian soft rock duo Air Supply from their seventh album, Now and Forever. The song reached the top 40 on the Billboard Hot 100, where it peaked at No. 38. On the Adult Contemporary chart, the song reached a peak of No. 13. On the Canadian Adult Contemporary chart, the song reached No. 3.

Billboard said that the song "caters to [Air Supply's] younger listeners" and commented on the hook and the song's "wistful lyricism."

Charts

Weekly charts

Track listing 
U.S. 7-inch single
A. "Young Love" - 3:46
B. "She Never Heard You Call" - 3:24

References

1982 songs
1982 singles
Air Supply songs
Songs written by Graham Russell
Song recordings produced by Harry Maslin
Arista Records singles
1980s ballads